Count Pál János Ede Teleki de Szék (1 November 1879 – 3 April 1941) was a Hungarian politician who served as Prime Minister of the Kingdom of Hungary from 1920 to 1921 and from 1939 to 1941.  He was also an expert in geography, a university professor, a member of the Hungarian Academy of Sciences, and chief scout of the Hungarian Scout Association. He descended from an aristocratic family from Transylvania.

Teleki tried to keep Hungary neutral during the early stages of the Second World War despite cooperating with Nazi Germany to regain Hungarian territory lost in the Treaty of Trianon. When Teleki learned that German troops had entered Hungary en route to invade Yugoslavia, effectively killing hopes of Hungarian neutrality, he committed suicide.

He is a controversial figure in Hungarian history because as prime minister he tried to preserve Hungarian autonomy under difficult political circumstances, but also proposed and enacted far-reaching anti-Jewish laws.

Early life

Teleki was born to Géza Teleki (1844–1913), a Hungarian politician and Interior Minister, and his wife Irén Muráty (Muratisz) (1852–1941), the daughter of a wealthy Greek merchant, in Budapest, Hungary. Irén Muráty was fluent in Greek. Her family, the Muráty (Greek: Μουράτη), originally came from Kozani, in northern Greece. Teleki attended Budapest Lutheran elementary school from 1885 to 1889, and Pest Calasanz High School ("gymnazium") from 1889 to 1897. In 1897 he started upper-division work at Budapest University studying law and political science. Teleki then studied at the Royal Hungarian Academy of Economy in Magyaróvár (Magyaróvári Magyar Királyi Gazdasági Akadémia), and after struggling to complete his studies, graduated with a PhD in 1903. He went on to become a university professor and expert on geography and socio-economic affairs in pre-World War I Hungary and a well-respected educator. For instance, Erik von Kuehnelt-Leddihn was one of his students. He fought in the First World War as a volunteer.

In 1918–19, he compiled and published a map depicting the ethnographic make up of the Hungarian nation. Based on the density of population according to the 1910 census, the so-called Red map was created for the peace talk in Treaty of Trianon. His maps were an excellent composition of social and geographic data, even by today's well-developed Geographic Information System's point of view. From 1911 to 1913 he was Director of Scientific Publishing for the Institute of Geography, and from 1910 to 1923 he was Secretary General of the Geographical Society. He was a delegate to the Versailles Peace Conference in 1919. Between 1937 and 1939, he was the Hungarian representative in the International committee on intellectual cooperation of the League of Nations.

Scouting
In the summer of 1927, Teleki's son Géza, a member of the Hungarian Sea Scouts,  was attending a Sea Scout rally held at Helsingør, Denmark. On a sailing cruise, he ignored a reprimand from his Scoutmaster, Fritz M. de Molnár, for failure to carry out a small but necessary exercise of seamanship. Molnár tried to drive home his point by threatening to tell the boy's father on their return to Budapest. Géza replied "Oh, Dad's not interested in Scouting." This roused Molnár's mettle, and he determined to take up the subject of Scouting with Count Teleki.

Molnár's talk about Scouting intrigued Teleki, and he was instrumental in supporting Scouting within Hungary. He became Hungary's Chief Scout, a member of the International Scout Committee from 1929 until 1939, Camp Chief of the 4th World Scout Jamboree held at The Royal Forest at Gödöllő, Hungary, Chief Scout of the Hungarian Scout Association, and a close friend and contemporary of Robert Baden-Powell, 1st Baron Baden-Powell. His influence and inspiration were a major factor in the success of Scouting in Hungary, and contributed to its success in other countries as well.

Political life

Preserved Hungarian autonomy

Some view Teleki as a moral hero who tried to avoid Hungary's involvement in World War II. He sent Tibor Eckhardt, a high ranking Smallholders Party politician, to the United States with $5 million for the Hungarian Minister in the United States, János Pelényi, to prepare the Hungarian government in exile, for when he and Regent Horthy would have to leave the country. According to supporters of this view, his object was to save what could be saved, under political and military pressure from Nazi Germany, and like the Polish government in exile, to try to survive in some fashion during the war years to come.

Teleki holds Hungary to "Non-belligerent" status

Rejoining the government in 1938 as Minister of Education, Teleki supported Germany's take over of Czechoslovakia with the hopes that the dismemberment of Hungary completed in the 1920 Treaty of Trianon would be undone. On 16 February 1939, Hungarian Prime Minister Béla Imrédy, who had been known as a pro-fascist, anti-Semitic leader, was forced from office after it was revealed that he was of Jewish descent. Teleki became Prime minister for the second time on 15 February 1939. While he strove to close down several fascist political parties, he did nothing to end the existing anti-Semitic laws.

On 24 August 1939, Nazi Germany and the Soviet Union signed the Molotov–Ribbentrop Pact, which stipulated the Soviet Union's long-standing "interest" in Bessarabia, Romania. One week later, on 1 September 1939, Germany invaded Poland and demanded the use of the Hungarian railway system through Kassa (then in Hungary) so that German troops could attack Poland from the south. Hungary traditionally had strong ties with Poland, and Teleki refused Germany's demand. Horthy told the German ambassador that "he would sooner blow up the rail lines than to participate in an attack on Poland" (which would completely paralyse the only railway connection from Hungary to Poland, if the Germans decided to march through Hungary without permission). Hungary declared that it was a "non-belligerent" nation and refused to allow German forces to travel through or over Hungary to attack Poland. As a result of Teleki's refusal to co-operate with Germany, during the autumn of 1939 and the summer of 1940 more than 100,000 Polish soldiers, and hundreds of thousands of civilians, many of them Jewish, escaped from Poland and crossed the border into Hungary. The Hungarian government then permitted the Polish Red Cross and the Polish Catholic Church to operate in the open. The Polish soldiers were formally interned, but most of them managed to flee to France by spring of 1940, thanks to the indulgent or friendly attitude of officials.

However, with Germany's seizure of Austria, Czechoslovakia and Poland, the buffer nations between Hungary and the belligerent nations of Germany and Soviet Union had evaporated. Germany made economic demands on Hungary to support the war, and offered to repay with arms deliveries, but because of developments in the Balkans, they were routed to the Romanian Army instead.

In his diaries, Italian Foreign Minister Galeazzo Ciano, Mussolini's son-in-law, wrote that during a visit to Rome by Teleki in March 1940, Teleki "has avoided taking any open position one way or the other but has not hidden his sympathy for the Western Powers and fears an integral German victory like the plague". Ciano reported that Teleki later said that he hoped "for the defeat of Germany, not a complete defeat—that might provoke violent shocks—but a kind of defeat that would blunt her teeth and claws for a long time".

Germany demands Hungary's assistance

In 1940, Germany used the Soviet Union's imminent movement to take over Bessarabia as an excuse to prepare to occupy the vital Romanian oil fields. Germany's General Staff approached Hungary's General Staff and sought passage of its troops through Hungary and for Hungary's participation in the takeover. Germany held out Transylvania as Hungary's reward. The Hungarian government resisted, desired to remain neutral and held out some hope for assistance from the Italians. Hungary sent a special envoy to Rome: "For the Hungarians there arises the problem either of letting the Germans pass, or opposing them with force. In either case the Hungarian liberty would come to an end". Mussolini replied, "How could this ever be since I am Hitler's ally and intend to remain so?" However, Teleki allowed German troops to cross Hungarian territory into southern Romania, with the reward in August 1940 of the return to Hungary of a large part of Teleki's ancestral Transylvanian homeland in the Second Vienna Award. In November, Teleki's government signed the Tripartite Pact, a move that would come back to haunt him only a few months later.

In March 1941, Teleki strongly objected to Hungarian participation in the invasion of Yugoslavia. Hungary's resistance to aiding Germany caused German mistrust. Hungary was not informed of Hitler's top-secret preparations for invading the Soviet Union and was not initially part of the invasion. "Hungary, in the period of preparation for Barbarossa, is not to be counted as an ally beyond the present status...."

Furthermore, German troops were not to cross Hungarian territories, and Hungarian airfields were not to be used by the Luftwaffe, according to the new directives of the High Command on 22 March 1941. Teleki believed that only a Danubian Federation could help the Central and Eastern European states (Austria, Czechoslovakia, Yugoslavia, Romania and Bulgaria) escape Germany's domination.

In the book, Transylvania The Land Beyond the Forest Louis C. Cornish described how Teleki, under constant surveillance by the German Gestapo during 1941, sent a secret communication to contacts in America.

In 1941, the American journalist Dorothy Thompson supported the statement of others: "I took from Count Teleki's office a monograph which he had written upon the structure of European nations. A distinguished geographer, he was developing a plan for regional federation, based upon geographical and economic realities". Teleki received no response to his ideas and was left to resolve the situation on his own.

Teleki must choose between Axis and Allies

The event that eventually led to Teleki's suicide began on 25 March 1941 when Yugoslav Prime Minister Dragisa Cvetkovic and Yugoslav Minister for Foreign Affairs Aleksandar Cincar Marković travelled to Vienna and signed the Tripartite Pact. In the late evening on 26/27 March 1941, Air Force Generals Dušan Simović and Borivoje Mirković had executed a bloodless coup d'état, refuted signatures on the alliance and accepted a British guarantee of security instead. Germany saw its southern flank potentially exposed just as it was preparing Operation Barbarossa, the invasion of the Soviet Union. Germany planned the invasion of Yugoslavia (Directive No. 25) to compel it to remain part of the Axis. Hitler used Hungary's membership in the Tripartite Pact to demand that Hungary join in. Döme Sztójay, the Hungarian ambassador to Germany, was sent home by air with a message for Horthy:

Teleki had signed a non-aggression pact, the Treaty of Eternal Friendship, with Yugoslavia on 12 December 1940, only five months earlier, and would not assent to assisting with the invasion. Teleki's government chose a middle ground, opting to remain out of the German-Yugoslav conflict unless either Hungarian minorities were in danger or Yugoslavia collapsed. Teleki relayed his government's position to London and sought allowance for Hungary's difficult position.

On 3 April 1941, Teleki received a telegram from the Hungarian minister in London that British Foreign Secretary Anthony Eden had threatened to break diplomatic relations with Hungary if it did not actively resist the passage of German troops across its territory and to declare war if it attacked Yugoslavia.

Teleki's enduring desire was to keep Hungary non-aligned but he could not ignore Nazi Germany's dominant influence. Teleki was now faced with two bad choices. He could continue to resist Germany's demands for its help in the invasion of Yugoslavia although he knew that would likely mean that after Germany conquered Yugoslavia, it would next turn its attention to Hungary, as had happened to Austria, Czechoslovakia and Poland. He could allow German troops to cross Hungarian territory even though it would betray Yugoslavia and lead the Allies to declare war on Hungary.

Horthy, who had resisted Germany's pressure, agreed to Germany's demands. Teleki met with the cabinet council that evening. He complained that Horthy had "told me thirty-four times that he would never make war for foreign interests, and now he has changed his mind".

Before Teleki could chart a course through the political thicket, the decision was torn from him by General Henrik Werth, the chief of the Hungarian General Staff. Without the sanction of the Hungarian government, Werth, of German origin, made private arrangements with the German High Command for the transport of the German troops across Hungary. Teleki denounced Werth's action as treason.

Germany enters Hungary, Teleki commits suicide

Shortly after 9:00 p.m., he left the Hungarian Ministry of Foreign Affairs for his apartment in the Sándor Palace. At around midnight, he received a call that is thought to have informed him that the German army had just started its march into Hungary. Teleki committed suicide with a pistol during the night of 3 April 1941 and was found the next morning. His suicide note said in part:

Winston Churchill later wrote, "His suicide was a sacrifice to absolve himself and his people from guilt in the German attack on Yugoslavia."  On 6 April 1941, Germany launched Operation Punishment (Unternehmen Strafgericht), the bombing of Belgrade, Yugoslavia. Some historians consider Teleki's suicide an act of patriotism. Britain shortly afterward broke diplomatic relations but did not declare war until December.

Befitting his commitment to Scouting and to Hungary, Teleki was buried at Gödöllő, the location of the Royal Palace.

Legacy

From Philo-Semitism to anti-Semitism

Teleki is considered "one of the most consistently unaccommodating anti-Semitic politicians of the post-Trianon period". His attitude towards Jews parallels the changing demographic and social situation in Hungary before and after World War I. In the Austro-Hungarian empire the generally fiercely patriotic Hungarian Jews were securing the tenuous Hungarian majority in the Hungarian kingdom. Consequently, Teleki stated at the peace conference of 1919 that "the majority of the Hungarian Jews have completely assimilated to the Hungarians [...] from a social point of view, the Hungarian Jews are not Jews any more but Hungarians." After 1920, with a greatly reduced Hungarian territory, Teleki changed his mind about the Hungarian Jews: he regarded the Jews as a "problem of life and death for the Hungarian people".
After Regent Horthy appointed Teleki Prime Minister on 19 July 1920 he introduced the first anti-Semitic laws introduced in Europe after the First World War, the so-called "Numerus Clausus Act" of 22 September 1920 which allowed Jews to attend universities only in a direct relation to their proportion of the Hungarian population. He and his government resigned less than a year later on 14 April 1921 when the former emperor, Karl IV, attempted to retake Hungary's throne.

From 1921 until 1938, Teleki was a professor at Budapest University. While there, journalists asked him what he thought about the anti-Jewish violence that had occurred on the university campus. He replied: "This din does not bother me. In any case, the students take examinations that test their knowledge of the sea and this din is aptly suited to that of the sea."

Due to the feudal nature of pre-War Hungarian society, where both rich and impoverished aristocrats tried to maintain an "aristocratic" life style and a disadvantaged peasant class had no means of learning and social mobility, the Hungarian Jews constituted a disproportionally large part of the Hungarian middle class. In the 1930 census, Jews comprised 5.1% of the population, but among physicians 54.5 percent were Jewish, journalists 31.7%, and lawyers 49.2%. Persons of Jewish faith controlled four of the five major banks, from 19.5 to 33% of the national income, and around 80 percent of the country's industry. Already after the short lived Hungarian Soviet Republic (21 March – 1 August 1919), whose leaders, concomitantly with their middle class origins, were often of Jewish parentage, and even more after the worldwide depression struck in the late 1920s and early 1930s, which conversely was associated with Jewish wealth and financial power, the country's Jews were made scapegoats for all of Hungary's economic, political and social plights.

After a period of considerable economic turbulence and a general political turn to the far right, Teleki became Prime Minister once again on 16 February 1939. Although considered an Anglophile, one of the first things he did in Parliament was to push the Second Anti-Jewish act initiated by his predecessor Béla Imrédy. This was the first law which defined the term "Jew" in explicitly racial terms: "A person belonging to the Jewish denomination is at the same time a member of the Jewish racial community and it is natural that the cessation of membership in the Jewish denomination does not result in any change in that person’s association with the racial community." It forbade Jews to hold any government position, to be editors, publishers, producers or directors. It restated and reinforced the Numerus Clausus act of 1920 and extended its provisions (representation according to proportion of population) to the business world, regulating even the number of Jewish employees (one in five or two in nine maximum, depending on the size). These laws would affect up to 825,000 Jews, who lived in territory reacquired by Hungary in 1941.

Teleki promulgated Law No. II relating to national defense, on 11 March 1939, and signed it into law on 12 May of the same year. The text of the bill stipulated that all young Jewish men of arms-bearing age to join forced-labor service. In 1940, this compulsory service was extended to all able-bodied male Jews. As a result of the laws established during Teleki's tenure, 15,000–35,000 Jews in the re-acquired part of Czechoslovakia, who had difficulty in proving their former Hungarian citizenship, were deported.

These Jews, without Hungarian citizenship, were sent to a location near Kamenets-Podolski, where in one of the first acts of mass killing during World War II, all but two thousand of these individuals were executed by the Nazi Einsatzgruppe (mobile killing unit).

Teleki wrote the preamble to the Second Anti-Jewish Law (1939) and prepared the Third Anti-Jewish Law in 1940. He also signed 52 anti-Jewish decrees during his rule, and members of his government issued 56 further decrees against Jews.

Teleki devoted a great deal of energy and political savvy to the passage of the second anti-Jewish bill, stating that he pushed it not for tactical reasons but because of his deep personal convictions. During Teleki's second term in 1940, Hungarian Arrow Cross leader Ferenc Szálasi was given amnesty, and the Nazi movement became stronger.

Although of laws the Labor Service System were put in effect during Teleki's lifetime, they were radically enforced only after Hungary had entered the war. Then the situation of the Jewish forced laborers, which were organized in labor battalions, commanded by Hungarian military officers, became really bad. They were engaged in war-related construction, often subject to extreme cold, and given inadequate shelter, food, and medical care. At least 27,000 Jewish forced laborers died before Germany occupied Hungary in March 1944, after which the Hungarian state authorities in close cooperation with the German "Sonderkommando" of Adolf Eichmann rapidly organized and implemented the mass deportation of Jews to the death camps.

While it is true that tens of thousands of young Hungarians were conscripted into military service at the same time and sent to fight on the Eastern Front against the Soviet Union, often ill-equipped and badly trained, and bore the brunt of the miseries of the German defeat, the Hungarian participation in the Eastern campaign was voluntary, and the suffering of its soldiers was war induced and not deliberately inflicted as with the Jewish labor battalions.

Statue controversy

In 2004, the Teleki Pál Memorial Committee, initially supported by Budapest mayor Gábor Demszky, proposed erecting a statue by Tibor Rieger in his honor on the 63rd anniversary of his death in front of the palace on Castle Hill where he governed and, finally, committed suicide. Because of his close connection with Hungarian anti-Semitism there was a strong opposition both by Hungarian liberals and Hungarian and international Jewish organizations, especially the Simon Wiesenthal Center and its leader Efraim Zuroff. Consequently, the mayor withdrew his support and the Minister of Culture István Hiller canceled the plans. On 5 April 2004, the statue was finally placed in the courtyard of the Catholic Church in the town of Balatonboglár on the shore of Lake Balaton. Balatonboglár had during World War II been host to thousands of Polish refugees who opened in that town one of only two secondary schools for Poles in Europe during 1939–1944. They credited Teleki with opening Hungary's borders to them and named a street in Warsaw for him after the war ended. In 2001 he was posthumously awarded Commander's Cross with Star of the Order of Merit of the Republic of Poland. In 2020 Teleki earned two monuments in Poland, one in Skierniewice and one in Cracow, both related to his pro-Polish stand during the Polish-Soviet war of 1920.

A street in Borča, a suburb of the Serbian capital Belgrade, was named "Ulica Pala Telekija" ("Pal Teleki Street") in 2011.

See also

 László Almásy
 Hungarian Turanism
 Hungary–Yugoslavia relations

References

External links

 
 Karsai László: Érvek a Teleki-szobor mellett or here (in Hungarian) (source: Élet és Irodalom, 48. évfolyam, 11. szám)
 About him in Magyar Életrajzi lexikon (in Hungarian)
 Time Magazine, 14 April 1941: End of a Tightrope Walk
 

1879 births
1941 suicides
Antisemitism in Hungary
Commander's Crosses with Star of the Order of Merit of the Republic of Hungary (civil)
Education ministers of Hungary
Foreign ministers of Hungary
Nobility from Budapest
Hungarian people of World War II
Hungarian politicians who committed suicide
Holocaust perpetrators in Hungary
Politicians from Budapest
Prime Ministers of Hungary
Scouting and Guiding in Hungary
Suicides by firearm in Hungary
Pal
World Scout Committee members
World War II political leaders
1941 deaths